Manasuku Nachindi is a 2018 Indian Telugu-language romantic drama film directed by debutante Manjula Ghattamaneni. It is jointly produced by Sanjay Swaroop and P. Kiran under his banner Anandi Art Creations. It features Sundeep Kishan, Amyra Dastur, Tridha Choudhury, and Adith Arun in the lead roles. Music was directed by Radhan. Dialogues in the film were written by Sai Madhav Burra. Released on 16 February 2018, the film failed to perform at the box office.

Plot

Cast 
 Sundeep Kishan as Suraj
 Amyra Dastur as Nithya 
 Tridha Choudhury as Nikki
 Adith Arun as Abhay
 Priyadarshi Pullikonda as Sarath
 Punarnavi Bhupalam as Lalli
 Jaanvi Swarup
 Abhay Bethiganti
 Mahesh Babu (voiceover)

Soundtrack 
The soundtrack of Manasuku Nachindi was composed by Radhan. Released through Aditya Music, all the songs were written by Ananta Sriram.

Release and reception 
The film was initially scheduled to release on 26 January 2018 but was postponed to 16 February 2018.

Hemant Kumar of the Firstpost rated the film 2 out of 5. " the story of Manasuku Nachindhi does have some merit, but it just does not get the cinematic treatment it deserves", Kumar wrote. The Hindu's Srivathsan Nadadhur called the film "old wine in a new bottle."  Nadadhur added that "Manasuku Nachindi tries to convey a lot, but all the cushioning that director Manjula does to cover up a stale story comes a cropper in a 150-minute preachy marathon."

Suhas Yellapantula writing for The Times of India rated the film two stars out of five and  "Manjula Ghattamaneni makes the film with all the right intentions but falters in its execution." On performances, Yellapantula opined that "Amyra Dastur is the only bright spark in this film, who lights up the screen with a wonderful performance. Sundeep, like the audience, seems confused. Tridha looks good but is overall unconvincing, while Nasser is wasted in a poorly written role."

References

External links 
 

2010s Telugu-language films
Indian romantic drama films
2018 romantic drama films